Laouali is a Nigerien surname. Notable people with the surname include:

 Idrissa Laouali (born 1979), Nigerien footballer 
 Ouma Laouali, Nigerien pilot, first woman pilot in Niger

Surnames of African origin